The 2012 BGL Luxembourg Open was a professional women's tennis tournament played on hard courts. It was the 17th edition of the tournament, which was part of the 2012 WTA Tour. It took place in Kockelscheuer, Luxembourg between 15 and 21 October 2011. Unseeded Venus Williams won the singles title.

Finals

Singles

  Venus Williams defeated  Monica Niculescu 6–2, 6–3

Doubles

  Andrea Hlaváčková /  Lucie Hradecká defeated  Irina-Camelia Begu /  Monica Niculescu 6–3, 6–4

Singles main-draw entrants

Seeds

 1 Rankings are as of October 8, 2012

Other entrants
The following players received wildcards into the singles main draw:
  Belinda Bencic
  Kirsten Flipkens 
  Mandy Minella

The following players received entry from the qualifying draw:
  Annika Beck
  Vera Dushevina
  Tatjana Malek
  Garbiñe Muguruza

The following players received entry as lucky loser:
  Anne Keothavong

Withdrawals
  Tímea Babos 
  Angelique Kerber (foot injury)
  Sloane Stephens
  Yanina Wickmayer (knee injury)

Retirements
  Peng Shuai (right shoulder injury)

Doubles main-draw entrants

Seeds

1 Rankings are as of October 8, 2012

Other entrants
The following pairs received wildcards into the doubles main draw:
  Mona Barthel /  Jelena Janković
  Belinda Bencic /  Claudine Schaul

Retirements
  Jelena Janković (gastrointestinal illness)

External links
 Official website 
 WTA tournament draws

BGL Luxembourg Open
Luxembourg Open
2012 in Luxembourgian tennis